Eerste Divisie 2008–09 began in August 2008 and concluded in May 2009, with the promotion playoffs. Sixteen clubs remained in the Eerste Divisie, whilst Excelsior and VVV-Venlo were relegated from the 2007–08 Eredivisie. VVV-Venlo won the league title and were promoted to the Eredivisie, the highest tier of football in the Netherlands, while eight other teams competed in a playoff with two Eredivisie sides for two Eredivisie places.

Standings

Period winners
The competition is divided into six periods of six matches each. The winner of each period qualifies for the playoffs at the end of the season. If the winner of a period has already won a prior period in the season, the second placed team in the period is awarded the playoff slot. If the second placed team has also won a prior period, no winner is called, and the playoff slot is decided by league standing at the end of the season.

Best Top Ranking Teams
Excelsior, Telstar, FC Zwolle, TOP Oss and Dordrecht were awarded play-off spot as their performance in the six periods, along with RKC Waalwijk and Cambuur, the two best placed team in Eerste Divisie who did not get a play-off spot via period route. As VVV-Venlo, one of the period winners, promoted as Eerste Divisie champions, MVV replaced them as the best placed team who did not qualify for play-off.

Results

Top scorers

Playoffs

Please note that the following teams: Roda JC & De Graafschap joined the Eerste Divisie-teams for the playoffs, after finishing 16th and 17th in the Eredivisie.

Round 1

|}

Round 2 (best of 3)

|}

Round 3 (best of 3)

|}

The 2 winners of Round 3 will play in Eredivisie 2009–10.

Overview

See also
 2008–09 Eredivisie
 2008–09 KNVB Cup

References

External links
JupilerLeague.nl - Official website Eerste Divisie 

Eerste Divisie seasons
2008–09 in Dutch football
Neth